Empty Hands and Heavy Hearts is the second full-length album by Texas melodic hardcore band Close Your Eyes, released on October 24, 2011, through Victory Records. It is the band's last album to feature lead vocalist Shane Raymond.

Background
Empty Hands and Heavy Hearts is the band's only album to feature drummer Tim Friesen after the departure of former drummer David Fidler.

The album's first single, "Valleys," was released on October 18, 2011. A music video was released for the song on October 20.

"Valleys" is also the theme song for Total Nonstop Action Wrestling's 2011 Turning Point pay-per-view. An edited music video centered on Jeff Hardy's worked shoot redemption storyline has been released through TNA's YouTube account.

Track listing

Personnel
Shane Raymond - lead vocals
Brett Callaway - guitar, backing vocals
Andrew Rodriguez - guitar
Sonny Vega - bass, backing vocals
Tim Friesen - drums, percussion

 Production
 Cameron Webb - producer, mixer

References

2011 albums
Close Your Eyes (band) albums
Victory Records albums